Kim Hyung-joo (born 12 September 1984 in Gyeongbuk) is a South Korean freestyle wrestler. In the women's 48 kg freestyle wrestling event at the 2008 Summer Olympics, she reached the quarter-finals, losing to Carol Huynh.  She competed in the freestyle 48 kg event at the 2012 Summer Olympics and was eliminated in the 1/8 finals by Iryna Merleni.

References

External links
 

1984 births
Living people
South Korean female sport wrestlers
Olympic wrestlers of South Korea
Wrestlers at the 2008 Summer Olympics
Wrestlers at the 2012 Summer Olympics
Asian Games medalists in wrestling
Wrestlers at the 2006 Asian Games
Wrestlers at the 2010 Asian Games
Sportspeople from North Gyeongsang Province
Medalists at the 2006 Asian Games
Medalists at the 2010 Asian Games
Asian Games silver medalists for South Korea
Asian Games bronze medalists for South Korea
Wrestlers at the 2018 Asian Games
Medalists at the 2018 Asian Games
20th-century South Korean women
21st-century South Korean women